3voor12 is a multimedia platform for alternative pop music of the Dutch public broadcaster VPRO.

3voor12 had 2 digital television channels (a clip-channel and a concert-channel), different radio channels (ranging from punk and alternative rock to heavy metal), radio programs on NPO 3FM, a website, and a weekly live event (Club 3voor12). In addition, 3voor12 is present at several festivals (Noorderslag, Lowlands, Motel Mozaïque, Pinkpop). 3voor12 has been awarded several times. Among the awards are the UPC Digital Award, the Pritchett-award, the BNN Rookie-Award, and the Gouden Pixel.

Similar in approach to the In a Van Sessions and The Take-Away Shows, the platform presents live performances of many touring artists recorded in elevators and other small rooms in the Netherlands under the umbrella name Behind Closed Doors. These videos are presented on their website, as well as an official 3voor12 YouTube account.

Radio
On radio, 3voor12 broadcasts almost every day between 21:00 and 00:00. The programs are: Club 3voor12 (Eric Corton, live music) and Whitenoise (Dave Clarke, techno music), both broadcast on Dutch radio station NPO 3FM.

Song of the Year
Since 1985, the listeners of 3voor12 have voted for the Song of the Year every year. All listeners can vote on a longlist at the end of the year. The Song of the Year will then be awarded during a concert evening organized by 3voor12. The Song van het Jaar has had nine Dutch winners with Osdorp Posse (1998), Krezip (2000), Johan (2001), Kyteman (2009), Dotan (2014), De Staat (2016), Kensington (2018), MEROL (2019) en Froukje (2021). Only Pixies (1988 and 1989), The Smashing Pumpkins (1993 and 1995) and Radiohead (1996 and 1997) have won more than once.

See also
 De Afrekening

References

External links
 

Dutch music websites
Netherlands Public Broadcasting